Riez Cathedral (Cathédrale Notre-Dame-de-l'Assomption de Riez) is a Roman Catholic church located in the town of Riez in the département of Alpes-de-Haute-Provence in south-eastern France. It is a national monument.

It was formerly the seat of the Bishopric of Riez, abolished by the Concordat of 1801, which transferred its territory to the Bishopric of Digne.

External links

Location of the cathedral

Former cathedrals in France
Churches in Alpes-de-Haute-Provence